Michael Peter (7 May 1949 – 23 October 1997) was a field hockey player from West Germany, who captained the West German team that won the gold medal at the 1972 Summer Olympics in Munich.

Twelve years later, at age 35, he was a member of the squad that won the silver medal at the 1984 Summer Olympics in Los Angeles, California. He was born in Heidelberg, Baden-Württemberg.

References
 sports-reference
 German hockey remains strong for Pete’s sake - stick2hockey

External links
 

1949 births
1997 deaths
German male field hockey players
Field hockey players at the 1972 Summer Olympics
Field hockey players at the 1976 Summer Olympics
Field hockey players at the 1984 Summer Olympics
Olympic field hockey players of West Germany
Medalists at the 1972 Summer Olympics
Medalists at the 1984 Summer Olympics
Olympic medalists in field hockey
Olympic gold medalists for West Germany
Olympic silver medalists for West Germany
Sportspeople from Heidelberg
20th-century German people